Sverdlovskaya is a rural locality (a village) in Verkhovskoye Rural Settlement, Tarnogsky District, Vologda Oblast, Russia. The population was 16 as of 2002.

Geography 
Sverdlovskaya is located 34 km west of Tarnogsky Gorodok (the district's administrative centre) by road. Kaplinskaya is the nearest rural locality.

References 

Rural localities in Tarnogsky District